Tighe may refer to:
 Tadhg, a given name
 Tighe, former name of Burlington, California
 Tighe, Indiana, an unincorporated community
 Tighe (surname), a surname (including a list of people with the name)

People with the given name Tighe
Tighe Dombrowski (born 1982), American soccer player
Tighe Scott (born 1949), American racecar driver